Voodoo Highway is the second studio album by the American hard rock band Badlands. After their first album, drummer Eric Singer left the band to join KISS, and was replaced by drummer Jeff Martin, who had previously sung lead vocals in the bands Surgical Steel and Racer X. Bassist Greg Chaisson was instrumental in getting his friend Jeff Martin the gig with Badlands. They had earlier played in the Phoenix, AZ bands Surgical Steel and St. Michael together and teamed up again in the Blindside Blues Band and RedSea following the demise of Badlands.

The song "Joe's Blues" is named after then Terriff and future Ozzy Osbourne guitarist Joe Holmes who worked as a guitar tech for Jake E Lee during the recording of Voodoo Highway.  Ray Gillen briefly joined Holmes in Terriff after leaving Badlands in 1992.

In 2005, American Idol star Bo Bice made the second to last round with his a cappella rendition of the album's closing track, "In a Dream".  He lost the season to Carrie Underwood, but judge Simon Cowell believed that Bice would have won, had he saved "In a Dream" for his final performance.

Track listing

Personnel
Badlands
Ray Gillen – lead vocals, second harmonica on track 7
Jake E. Lee – guitars, Moog bass, organ, piano, güiro, tambourine and percussion
Greg Chaisson – electric and acoustic basses
Jeff Martin – drums, assorted percussion, first harmonica on track 7, backing vocals

Production
James A. Ball – co-producer, engineer, mixing at Westlake Audio, Los Angeles
Brad Aldridge, Michael Malina – mixing engineers
Gina Immel, Mike Gunderson, Steve Harrison – assistant engineers at Rumbo Recorders
Chris Kupper – assistant engineer at Indigo Ranch and Studio II
Greg Calbi – mastering at Sterling Sound, New York

Charts

References

External links
 Album information at Black Sabbath Online

Badlands (American band) albums
1991 albums
Atlantic Records albums